Chakkar is a 2022 Pakistani murder mystery film directed by Yasir Nawaz produced by Nida Yasir under the banner of Farid Nawaz Productions. It stars Ahsan Khan and Neelam Muneer with Yasir Nawaz and Jawed Sheikh in supporting roles. The film is released on Eid al-Fitr 3 May 2022 with negative reviews from critics towards its storyline, performance and direction. The film was declared a box office bomb.

Cast
 Ahsan Khan as Kabir Ahmed: Mehreen's husband, Zara's partner in crime. (Main antagonist)
 Neelam Muneer in dual roles
Mehreen Khan: Kabir's wife, Zara's sister, (Dead)
Zara Khan: Mehreen's sister, Kabir's partner in crime. (Antagonist)
 Yasir Nawaz as Inspector Shahzad.
 Ahmed Hassan
 Jawed Sheikh 
 Naveed Raza as Naved
Mehmood Aslam
 Suhail Khan as Insurance Officer
 Danish Nawaz as Director (cameo)
 Shoaib Malik in a (cameo appearance)

Production
The film was officially announced in 2019 with Feroze Khan and Mawra Hocane in the leading cast. In early 2020, it revealed that Khan has been replaced by Ahsan Khan while Neelam Muneer has replaced Hocane. The film's principal photography began in March 2020 in Karachi. The film was wrapped up on 27 December 2020.

Soundtrack 
The music of the film is composed by Naveed Naushad.

Release 
In January 2021, it was announced that it is set to be released on the occasion of Eid-ul-Fitr 2022. It had a world television premiere on Eid al-Adha, 10 July 2022, on ARY Digital.

References

External links

2020s Urdu-language films
Lollywood films
Pakistani action films
2022 films